"Brontosaurus" is a song by rock group the Move, written, sung and produced by Move guitarist Roy Wood. It reached number 7 in the UK Singles Chart during April 1970, and number 36 in Canada.

Release
Released as a single early in 1970, it was also included on the band's Looking On album near the end of that year. With its aggressive guitar riff and growling vocal, the song marked a major shift in sound compared to their previous, more pop-oriented singles, bearing a much closer resemblance to their most recent album, Shazam.

This song was the first Move recording made after former Idle Race front man Jeff Lynne had joined, and he contributed guitar and piano. Lynne had been recruited into the group with the main aim of developing the embryonic Electric Light Orchestra, though they were contractually required to keep The Move (with their proven track record as a hit singles outfit) functioning in order to help finance the new project.  This single (including its B-side, "Lightning Never Strikes Twice") was  the only Move production after Lynne's addition that was credited solely to Wood; all subsequent releases (including the first ELO album) were credited to both Wood and Lynne.

When The Move promoted "Brontosaurus" on Top of the Pops on BBC TV, Wood - who had never appeared on television as the group's frontman before - appeared in the makeup that he would use extensively with Wizzard.

References

1970 singles
Song recordings produced by Roy Wood
Song recordings produced by Jeff Lynne
The Move songs
Songs written by Roy Wood
Regal Zonophone Records singles
1970 songs
Songs about dinosaurs